This is a list of sugar manufacturers in the Democratic Republic of the Congo.

Established sugar manufacturers in DR Congo:
 South Kivu Sugar Refinery (French: Sucrerie du Kivu): formerly Kiliba Sugar Refinery (French: Sucrerie de Kiliba)
 Kwilu Ngongo Sugar Refinery
 Lotokila Sugar Refinery (closed in 2010)

Output and market share

As of December 1990, the output and market share of each manufacturer is summarized in the table below:

At that time, national sugar consumption was estimated at 130,000 tons annually, leaving an import window of 34,600 tons annually.

See also
Economy of the Democratic Republic of the Congo

References

External links
 Democratic Republic of the Congo - Sugar Cane Production Quantity 1961 to 2019

Sugar companies of the Democratic Republic of the Congo
Sugar manufacturers
sugar manufacturers in the Democratic Republic of the Congo